The Battle of Puruarán was a battle of the War of Mexican Independence that occurred on 5 January 1814 in the area around Puruarán, Michoacán. The battle was fought between the royalist forces loyal to the Spanish crown and the Mexican rebels fighting for independence from the Spanish Empire. The Mexican insurgents were commanded by Mariano Matamoros y Guridi and the Spanish by Agustín Cosme Damián de Iturbide y Arámburu who would later go on to become the Mexican emperor, and by Ciriaco del Llano. The battle lasted approximately one hour and resulted in a victory for the Spanish Royalists.

The battle
This short battle was a complete loss for the Mexican rebels. After a battle lasting about an hour, the smaller royalist army soundly defeated the Mexican rebels inflicting heavy casualties. The Mexican commander, Mariano Matamoros was captured whilst attempting to flee the field of battle by a loyalist cadet named Eusebio Rodríguez. In addition to losing a majority of their army, the Mexicans also lost 23 artillery pieces and around 1,000 muskets to the Spanish.

Aftermath 
After taking stock of their tremendous losses, the Mexican rebels attempted to bargain for the life of General Matamoros who had been the second in command of José María Morelos' forces. They petitioned the government of the Spanish Viceroyalty for a prisoner exchange where they would return 200 captured royalist soldiers for Matamoros. The Spanish refused the offer and ordered the execution by firing squad of Matamoros on 3 February 1814.

After the death of Matamoros, José María Morelos ordered the execution of all 200 Spanish royalist prisoners.

See also 
 Mexican War of Independence
 Mariano Matamoros y Guridi
 José María Morelos

Bibliography 

Puruaran
Puruaran
Puruaran
Puruaran
Conflicts in 1814
1814 in New Spain
January 1814 events